Freindlich is a surname which is a variant of the German surname Freundlich. Notable people with the surname include:

Alisa Freindlich (born 1934), Soviet and Russian actress
Bruno Freindlich (1909–2002), Soviet/Russian actor of German ancestry

See also
Freundlich